Langrisser III is the sequel to Langrisser II, released in a number of Asian countries but not in the West. It is the first 32-bit installment in the series.

Langrisser III introduced a non-linear relationship system similar to dating sims. Depending on the player's choices and actions, the feelings of the female allies will change towards the player character, who will end up with the female ally he is closest with.

Story 
Even though Langrisser III is titled as such, it is a prequel to the first two titles in the series, and deals with the creation of the sword Langrisser. Consequentially, it is also set before the prequel series Elthlead, and lays the foundation for the wars which take place in that strategy series. The game also introduces the genealogies which dominate most of the Langrisser series, with the exception of Langrisser IV, which is set on the Western continent Yeless.

Limited edition 
The limited edition of Langrisser III includes an artbook and a holographic cover.

References 

1996 video games
J.C.Staff
Japan-exclusive video games
PlayStation 2 games
Sega Saturn games
Video game prequels
Video games with 2.5D graphics
3
Single-player video games
Taito games
Tactical role-playing video games
Video games developed in Japan
Career Soft games